Rugulina tenuis is a species of sea snail, a marine gastropod mollusk in the family Pendromidae.

Description
The shell grows to a length of 2.5 mm.

Distribution
This species occurs in the Weddell Sea, Antarctica.

References

External links
 To Encyclopedia of Life
 To World Register of Marine Species

Pendromidae
Gastropods described in 1912